Shawn Layden (born June 25, 1961) is an American businessman and was the Chairman of SIE Worldwide Studios. Previously, he served as the president and CEO of  Sony Interactive Entertainment America (SIEA), executive vice president and COO of Sony Network Entertainment International (SNEI).

Career
Layden joined Sony's corporate communications department in 1987 in Tokyo, Japan, and was the Communications Assistant for Sony co-founder Akio Morita for several years. Layden managed international software development at Sony Computer Entertainment's London Studio until 1999, when he became Vice President of Sony Computer Entertainment Europe. After serving almost nine years he became President of Sony Computer Entertainment Japan in October 2007, a position which he held until March 2010. In 2010, he was one of the founding members of Sony Network Entertainment International, serving as its Executive Vice President and COO.

In April 2014, Layden succeeded Jack Tretton as President and CEO of SCEA after Tretton stepped down from the position the previous month following a mutual agreement between Tretton and SCEA not to renew Tretton's contract. Following his appointment as President, Layden participated in Sony's conferences at E3 from 2014 to 2018.

In March 2018, Layden's role shifted to focus solely on Worldwide Studios, to "provide platform-defining content that helps drive the growth of SIE."

Sony announced on September 30, 2019 that Layden was stepping down from CEO of SIE Worldwide Studios. Journalists at the time believed this may have been due to a result of an internal power struggle with SIE President Jim Ryan over the further restructuring and globalization of SIE, However, in September 2021, Layden stated he retired due to exhaustion, believing the launch of the PlayStation 5 was a "good time to put the pin in my legacy."

Layden announced in September 2022 that he had joined Tencent Games as a strategic advisor.

Personal
Layden graduated from the University of Notre Dame in 1983 with a Bachelor of Arts in American Studies. He is proficient in the Japanese language.

References

1961 births
Living people
Sony Interactive Entertainment people
Sony people
American chief operating officers
Video game businesspeople
Notre Dame College of Arts and Letters alumni